The 1934–35 1re série season was the 19th season of the 1re série, the top level of ice hockey in France. Stade Français won their third championship.

Tournament

Semifinals
 Stade Français - Chamonix Hockey Club 9:2 (0:0, 6:0, 3:2)

Final
 Stade Français - Français Volants 4:3 OT (1:0, 2:2, 0:1, 1:0)

External links
Season on hockeyarchives.info

Fra
1934–35 in French ice hockey
Ligue Magnus seasons